The Summer of Champions is an annual set of pre-season fixtures normally between German football clubs and other European football clubs.

Although trophies can be awarded to the winner of certain matches (example: Chevrolet Cup for Hannover 96 vs. Manchester United) there is no tournament winner. All matches are friendlies and the only thing to link them is that they are organised by the same company.

History

The Summer of Champions was founded in 2010, by Sportfive's subsidiary, "The Sports Promoters". The 2010 edition featured 5 German clubs (1.FC Kaiserslautern, Hannover 96, Eintracht Frankfurt, Hamburger SV, and Borussia Dortmund), 3 English clubs (Liverpool F.C., Chelsea FC, and Manchester City), and 1 Spanish club (Valencia CF). The 2011 edition featured a match which didn't include a German side, but was played in Bochum, Germany. The 2012 edition featured a match which didn't include any German side, and was played outside Germany. Also, since 2012 it was hosted the Summer of Champions' Cup in Bucharest, Romania.

Year-by-Year
Summer of Champions
• 2010
• 2011
• 2012

Summer of Champions' Cups
• 2012
• 2013

Participants 

Source:

See also
Summer of Champions' Cup

References

German football friendly trophies